Richard E. Roeper (born October 17, 1959) is an American columnist and film critic for the Chicago Sun-Times. He co-hosted the television series At the Movies with Roger Ebert from 2000 to 2008, serving as the late Gene Siskel's successor. From 2010 to 2014, he co-hosted The Roe and Roeper Show with Roe Conn on WLS-AM. From October 2015 to October 2017, Roeper served as the host of the FOX 32 morning show Good Day Chicago.

Early life
Roeper was born in Chicago, Illinois. He grew up in south suburban Dolton, Illinois and attended Thornridge High School before graduating from Illinois State University in 1982 with a bachelor's degree in journalism. While still a student at the university, he auditioned for the movie review program Sneak Previews when Gene Siskel and Roger Ebert (his future co-host on At the Movies) left the program, which he was turned down.

Career
Roeper began working as a columnist for the Chicago Sun-Times in 1986. The topics of his columns ranged from politics to media to entertainment.

He has also written seven books on topics ranging from movies to urban legends to conspiracy theories to the Chicago White Sox. In 2009, Roeper appeared on Howard Stern's show and said he had written a book on gambling, entitled Bet the House, which was released in the first quarter of 2010.

Roeper was a radio host on WLS AM 890 in Chicago. He also hosted shows on WLUP-FM, WLS-FM, and WMVP-AM in Chicago. He won three Emmy awards for his news commentaries on Fox in the 1990s and was the film critic for CBS in Chicago for three years in the early 2000s. He won the National Headliner Award as the top newspaper columnist in the country in 1992 and has been voted the best columnist in Illinois by the Associated Press on numerous occasions.

His columns have been syndicated by The New York Times to worldwide publications. Roeper has written for a number of magazines, including Esquire, Spy, TV Guide, Playboy, Maxim, and Entertainment Weekly. He was once named one of People magazine's most eligible bachelors.

Roeper was a frequent guest on The Tonight Show, Live with Regis and Kelly, The O'Reilly Factor, and countless other national programs. He also hosted Starz Inside, a monthly documentary series that aired on the Starz network. Roeper appeared on the first episode of the fifth season of Entourage, where he reviewed a fake movie titled Medellin with Michael Phillips on At the Movies. In April 2008, Roeper was the central figure on an episode of Top Chef, where contestants served up movie-themed dishes to Roeper and his friends (including Aisha Tyler).

In February 2009, Roeper launched his website, which features movie reviews, blog entries, photos, and Twitter posts. In December 2009, he launched a video section that featured on-camera reviews of movies. The video segments were originally produced in partnership with the Starz premium cable channel. Roeper announced that the reviews would appear first on his site, then on the Starz channel.

In December 2009, it was reported that Roeper had signed with ReelzChannel to be a regular contributor. Beginning in December 2010, Roeper began producing video reviews for ReelzChannel. He stopped reviewing movies for ReelzChannel in February 2015; his final review was for the Jude Law disaster film Black Sea.

From April 12, 2010, to October 7, 2014, he co-hosted The Roe & Roeper Show with Roe Conn on Chicago's WLS 890 radio station from 2-6 pm CST.

In October 2015, Roeper joined the cast of the Fox Chicago morning TV show Good Day Chicago. He signed off from that morning TV show on October 18, 2017.

Roeper was suspended from the Sun-Times on January 29, 2018, pending an investigation into allegations that he had purchased Twitter followers. On February 2, the Sun-Times released a statement stating that their investigation did find that Roeper purchased over 25,000 fake followers. The paper later reinstated him, though he was required to begin using a new account on which he was explicitly disallowed from buying followers.

Film critic
After Gene Siskel of Siskel & Ebert died on Saturday, February 20, 1999, Roger Ebert co-hosted the show with nearly 30 guest critics. After ten appearances on the program, Roeper was offered the opportunity to co-host the popular film review show with Ebert permanently. The series was renamed Ebert & Roeper and the Movies in 2000. The title was shortened to Ebert & Roeper in 2001. Before this, he conducted an interview in 1995 with Siskel and Ebert to commemorate the 20th anniversary of their partnership.

Beginning in August 2006, while his co-host Roger Ebert was recovering from cancer surgery, Roeper was joined by numerous guest critics, including Clerks director Kevin Smith, The Tonight Show host Jay Leno, and singer-songwriter John Mellencamp. On Sunday, July 20, 2008, Roeper announced that he was leaving the show in mid-August and would return with a new show later in the year. However, plans for a new program starring Roeper failed to materialize.

Between 2009 and late 2010, Roeper contributed video reviews to Starz. In December 2010, he moved to ReelzChannel, where he contributed a segment titled Richard Roeper's Reviews every weekday at 5:00 PM ET. Roeper remained with the network until early 2015. In early 2013, Roeper began contributing film reviews to RogerEbert.com. On September 12, 2013, it was announced that Roeper will replace Roger Ebert as the main movie critic for the Chicago Sun-Times after his death on April 4, 2013 at the age of 70. In August 2014, Roeper became first-string film critic for the Chicago Sun-Times, where he made his debut reviewing Guardians of the Galaxy.

Preferences

Favorites
Roeper has cited The Maltese Falcon, The Godfather trilogy, and Ferris Bueller's Day Off as among his favorite films. On Ferris Bueller's Day Off he stated that, "It has one of the highest 'repeatability' factors of any film I've ever seen...I can watch it again and again. There's also this, and I say in all sincerity: Ferris Bueller's Day Off is something of a suicide prevention film or, at the very least, a story about a young man trying to help his friend gain some measure of self-worth...Ferris has made it his mission to show Cameron that the whole world in front of him is passing him by and that life can be pretty sweet if you wake up and embrace it. That's the lasting message of Ferris Bueller's Day Off." Roeper pays homage to the film with a license plate that says "SVFRRIS". In a 2000 interview, he cited Woody Allen as a hero of filmmaking. Among his favorite films from the 1990s are Goodfellas, Pulp Fiction, Heat, Good Will Hunting, and Notting Hill. In November 2004, on a special segment of Ebert & Roeper, Roeper stated that his all-time favorite film about Thanksgiving is Planes, Trains and Automobiles. In December 2009, Roeper selected The Departed as the best film of the 2000s. In December 2019, Roeper selected The Social Network as the best film of the 2010s.

Best films of the year
Since 2000, Roeper compiled "best of the year" film lists which helped to provide an overview of his critical preferences. His top choices were:

 2000: Crouching Tiger, Hidden Dragon
 2001: Memento
 2002: Gangs of New York
 2003: In America
 2004: Hotel Rwanda
 2005: Syriana
 2006: The Departed
 2007: Michael Clayton
 2008: Slumdog Millionaire
 2009: Brothers

 2010: Inception
 2011: Drive
 2012: Zero Dark Thirty
 2013: American Hustle
 2014: Boyhood
 2015: Room
 2016: Manchester by the Sea
 2017: Three Billboards Outside Ebbing, Missouri
 2018: Widows
 2019: The Irishman

 2020: Nomadland
 2021: Belfast
 2022: The Whale

Filmography

Bibliography
 He Rents, She Rents: The Ultimate Guide to the Best Women's Films and Guy Movies, with Laurie Viera (1999)
 Hollywood Urban Legends: The Truth Behind All Those Delightfully Persistent Myths of Films, Television, and Music  (2001)
 Urban Legends: The Truth Behind All Those Deliciously Entertaining Myths That Are Absolutely, Positively, 100% Not True (2001)
 Ten Sure Signs a Movie Character Is Doomed, and Other Surprising Movie Lists (2003)
 Schlock Value: Hollywood At Its Worst (2005)
 Sox and the City: A Fan's Love Affair with the White Sox from the Heartbreak of '67 to the Wizards of Oz (2006)
 Debunked!: Conspiracy Theories, Urban Legends, and Evil Plots of the 21st Century (2008)
 Bet the House: How I Gambled Over a Grand a Day for 30 Days on Sports, Poker, and Games of Chance (2010)

References

External links
 
 Biography from TV Tome
 

1959 births
20th-century American male writers
20th-century American non-fiction writers
21st-century American male writers
21st-century American non-fiction writers
American columnists
American film critics
American film historians
American male non-fiction writers
Chicago Sun-Times people
Critics of conspiracy theories
Film theorists
Historians from Illinois
Illinois State University alumni
Living people
People from Dolton, Illinois
Television personalities from Chicago
Writers from Chicago